Yair Michaeli (יאיר מיכאלי; born September 13, 1944) is an Israeli former Olympic competitive sailor. During the Yom Kippur War, he served on an Israeli Navy patrol boat. He is married to Mandy Michaeli.

Sailing career
At an international competition in the Olympic-class Flying Dutchman dinghy in the Netherlands in April 1972, the Sdot Yam team of Michaeli and Itzhak Nir won the right to be the first Israeli sailors to participate in the Olympics.

Michaeli competed for Israel at the 1972 Summer Olympics off the coast of Kiel, 900 kilometers from Munich, Germany, at the age of 27, with Itzhak Nir in Sailing--Mixed Two Person Heavyweight Dinghy/Flying Dutchman.  He and Nir did not participate in the final race of the competition, due to the Munich Massacre in which Arab terrorists from the Black September group killed 11 Israeli Olympians at Fürstenfeldbruck Air Base outside of Munich. They came in 26th.

The Israeli government then decided to withdraw from the Olympic Games, and bring their remaining Olympians home. Michaeli, Nir, and Israeli racewalker Shaul Ladany wanted to stay for the closing ceremony, to show that they were not leaving "with their tails between their legs", but they followed the orders of the government.

References

External links
the-sports bio

Sailors at the 1972 Summer Olympics – Flying Dutchman
Living people
Olympic sailors of Israel
Jewish sailors (sport)
1944 births
Israeli male sailors (sport)